Steven Gunn is an English historian and fellow of Merton College, University of Oxford. He teaches and researches the history of late medieval and early modern Britain and Europe, and is the author of a number of academic texts.

Biography
Gunn's research interests lie in the political, social, cultural and military history of England and its European neighbours, spanning the mid-fifteenth to the late sixteenth century.

Selected publications
 Arthur Tudor, Prince of Wales: Life, Death and Commemoration, Edited with Linda Monckton (Woodbridge, 2009)
 War and the Emergence of the State: Western Europe 1350-1600, in European Warfare 1350-1750, edited by Frank Tallett and David Trim (Cambridge, 2010), 50-73
 Henry VII’s New Men and the Making of Tudor England,  Oxford University Press, August 2016
 The English People at War in the Age of Henry VIII, Oxford University Press, January 2018

See also
Roger Highfield
John Roberts
Philip Waller
Robert Gildea

References

External links
Steven Gunn at Oxford Faculty of History Retrieved 5 August 2020
Steven Gunn at Merton College website Retrieved 5 August 2020
Steven Gunn at YouTube Retrieved 5 August 2020

Living people
English historians
Fellows of Merton College, Oxford
Year of birth missing (living people)